Fuad Toptani was an Albanian politician and mayor of Tirana from 1925 through 1927.
He was a delegate in the Albanian Congress of Trieste of 1913.

References

Year of birth missing
Year of death missing
Mayors of Tirana
Fuat